Greece competed at the 1980 Winter Olympics in Lake Placid, United States.

Alpine skiing

Men

References
Official Olympic Reports
 Olympic Winter Games 1980, full results by sports-reference.com

Nations at the 1980 Winter Olympics
1980
Olympics